Palladium is a chemical element with symbol Pd and atomic number 46.

Palladium, The Palladium or Paladium may also refer to:

Religion and mythology
 Palladium (classical antiquity), a statue that protected Troy and later Rome
 Palladium (protective image), an object believed to protect a city or nation from harm, a meaning generalized from the Trojan Palladium

Art, entertainment, and media

Games
 Palladium, a clone of the Arcadia 2001 game console
 Palladium, the currency in the 2007 game Hellgate: London
 Palladium Fantasy Role-Playing Game, by publisher Palladium Books
 Paladium, a French Minecraft server
 Palladium: Adventure in Greece, a 2021 video game by NLB Project

Music

Groups
 Palladium (Australian band)
 Palladium (British band)

Albums
 Palladium, an 1991 album by Autopsia
 Palladium, an 2022 album by Greyson Chance
 Palladium, an 2021 album by April March and Olivia Jean

Songs
 "Palladium", a song by Epica from their 2005 album Consign To Oblivion 
 "Palladíum", a song by Weather Report from their 1977 album Heavy Weather
 "Palladium", a song by Greyson Chance from their 2022 album Palladium
 "Palladium", a 2002 song by Alan Braxe and Fred Falke
 "Palladium", a song by Brigitte from their 2017 album Nues
 "Palladium", a song by Kacy Hill from their 2020 album Is It Selfish If We Talk About Me Again
 "Palladium", a 2023 song by 1luu
 "Palladium", a song by Tamba 4 from their 1968 album Samba Blim
 "Palladium", a 2016 song by Thomas Mengel
 "Palladium", a song by Ronesh from their 2019 album Stone Groove
 "Palladium", a song by Melomax from their 2017 album Firstfruits

Other uses in art, entertainment, and media
 "Palladium", one of several regular stages at the Parachute music festival
 The Palladium, the official student publication of the Ateneo Law School

Brands and enterprises
Palladium, a French boot producer
Palladium Books, a game publisher
Palladium Card, an elite credit card from JPMorgan Chase now branded as J.P. Morgan Reserve Card

Buildings

United States
 Palladium (New York City), a concert hall and later a nightclub in New York City, in the late 1980s and early 1990s
 Palladium Hall, a dormitory for New York University students located where the nightclub once stood
 Palladium (St. Louis), former home of the Paradise Club jazz club
 Hollywood Palladium, a theatre in Los Angeles, US
 Palladium at St. Petersburg College, a former church now serving as a theater in St. Petersburg, Florida
 Palladium Ballroom, a dance hall in New York City, that was located above a Rexall Drugstore at the corner of 53rd Street and Broadway in New York City, from 1948 to 1966
 The Palladium at the Center for the Performing Arts, a world class concert hall in Carmel, Indiana
 Worcester Palladium, a concert venue in Worcester, Massachusetts

Others
 Palladium, a concert venue and convention center in Cologne, Germany
 Palladium (Ottawa), a sports arena in Canada, now the Canadian Tire Centre
 Palladium (Prague), a shopping centre in the Czech Republic
 Palladium (Stockholm), a cinema in the Swedish capital
 Palladium Cinema, Lichfield, a former cinema in Lichfield, England
 The Palladium (Dubai), a 35-floor mixed use residential and office tower
 The Palladium Niteclub, a night club in Christchurch, New Zealand from 1986 to 1998
 London Palladium, a theatre in London, UK, owned by Andrew Lloyd Webber

Computing and technology	
 Palladium, the codename for Next-Generation Secure Computing Base, a trusted computing initiative begun by Microsoft
 PALLADIUM, a 1958 Central Intelligence Agency Directorate of Science & Technology program to study and interfere with Soviet radar
 Cadence Palladium, a hardware accelerated emulator for functional verification of RTL, by Cadence Design Systems

See also

 Andrea Palladio (1508–1580), Italian Renaissance architect
 Palladian architecture, a style of architecture created by Andrea Palladio
 PD (disambiguation)
 Isotopes of palladium